Virugampakkam is a legislative assembly constituency in the Indian state of Tamil Nadu. Its State Assembly Constituency number is 22. It comprises a part of Chennai and falls under Chennai South Lok Sabha constituency for national elections to the Parliament of India. The constituency was created following delimitation of constituencies in 2007. It is one of the 234 State Legislative Assembly Constituencies in Tamil Nadu.

Overview
As per orders of the Delimitation Commission, No. 22 Virugampakkam Assembly constituency is composed of Ward 65 & 128-131 of Greater Chennai Corporation

Election results

2021

2016

2011

References

Assembly constituencies of Tamil Nadu
Politics of Chennai